Memnune Aydan Şener (born 1 March 1963) is a Turkish film and television actress, former model, Miss Turkey 1981 and a beauty contestant in Miss World 1981.

Biography
She was born in Kilis, a town in south-central Turkey, in 1963. She moved to Bursa in her early childhood along with her family. She completed her secondary and high school education in Bursa. She was elected Miss Turkey in 1981 and represented Turkey at the Miss World beauty pageant in the same year. Having worked as a model for a short while, she started her acting career with the TV series "Küçük Ağa" in 1983.

Filmography

References

External links
 
 Biyografi.TV - Biography of Aydan Şener 

1963 births
People from Kilis
Living people
Miss Turkey winners
Miss World 1981 delegates
Turkish people of Tatar descent
20th-century Turkish actresses